The 2017 Big 12 Conference women's basketball tournament was the postseason women's basketball tournament for the Big 12 Conference that was held March 3 to 6, 2017, in Oklahoma City at Chesapeake Energy Arena. West Virginia won their first Big 12 Tournament title after upsetting #1 seeded Baylor 77-66 to win an automatic bid to the NCAA women's tournament

Seeds

Schedule

Bracket

All-Tournament team
Most Outstanding Player – Tynice Martin, West Virginia

See also
2017 Big 12 Conference men's basketball tournament
2017 NCAA Women's Division I Basketball Tournament
2016–17 NCAA Division I women's basketball rankings

References

External links
 2017 Phillips 66 Big 12 Conference women's basketball tournament Official Website

Big 12 Conference women's basketball tournament
Tournament
Big 12 Conference women's basketball tournament
Big 12 Conference women's basketball tournament